Rhamnus × intermedia is a hybrid species of plant in the family Rhamnaceae. It is a hybrid between Rhamnus orbiculata and Rhamnus saxatilis. It is found in Albania, Bosnia and Herzegovina, and Croatia.

References

intermedia
Plant nothospecies
Flora of Albania
Flora of Bosnia and Herzegovina
Flora of Croatia
Least concern plants
Least concern biota of Europe
Taxonomy articles created by Polbot
Taxobox binomials not recognized by IUCN